RasenBallsport Leipzig e.V., commonly known as RB Leipzig, is a German professional football club based in Leipzig, Saxony. The club was founded in 2009 by the initiative of the company Red Bull GmbH, which purchased the playing rights of fifth-tier side SSV Markranstädt with the intent of advancing the new club to the top-flight Bundesliga within eight years. The men's professional football club is run by the spin-off organization RasenBallsport Leipzig GmbH. RB Leipzig plays its home matches at the Red Bull Arena. The club nickname is Die Roten Bullen (English: The Red Bulls).

In its inaugural season in 2009–10, RB dominated the NOFV-Oberliga Süd (V) and was promoted as champions to the Regionalliga Nord (IV). RB Leipzig won the 2012–13 Regionalliga Nordost season without a single defeat and was promoted to the 3. Liga (III), then finished the 2013–14 3. Liga season as runners-up and was promoted to the 2. Bundesliga (II) as the first team since the introduction of the 3. Liga to win promotion after only one season. On 12 May 2016, RB Leipzig ensured promotion to the Bundesliga for the 2016–17 season with a 2–0 win over Karlsruher SC.

RB Leipzig earned a place in the UEFA Champions League for the first time by finishing as runners-up in the 2016–17 Bundesliga. They reached the semi-finals of the 2019–20 UEFA Champions League, losing to Paris Saint-Germain of France. On 21 May 2022, they won their first major title, the DFB-Pokal, against SC Freiburg.

History

2006–2009: Negotiations with various clubs and founding
Before investing in Leipzig, Red Bull GmbH, led by co-owner Dietrich Mateschitz, searched three and a half years for a suitable location for an investment in German football. Besides Leipzig, the company also considered a location in western Germany and explored cities such as Hamburg, Munich and Düsseldorf.

The company made its first attempt to enter the German football scene in 2006. On the advice of Franz Beckenbauer, a personal friend of Dietrich Mateschitz, the company decided to invest in Leipzig. The local football club FC Sachsen Leipzig, successor to the former East German champions BSG Chemie Leipzig, had for years been in financial difficulties. Red Bull GmbH drew up plans to invest up to 50 million euros in the club. The company planned a takeover, with a change of team colours and of club name. Involved in the arrangements was film entrepreneur Michael Kölmel, sponsor of FC Sachsen Leipzig and owner of the Zentralstadion. By 2006, FC Sachsen Leipzig played in the Oberliga, by then the fourth tier in the German football league system. Playing in the fourth tier, the club had to undergo the German Football Association (DFB) licensing procedure. Red Bull GmbH and the club were close to a deal, but the plans were vetoed by the DFB, who rejected the proposed new club name "FC Red Bull Sachsen Leipzig" and feared too much influence from the company. After months of fan protests against Red Bull's involvement, when they deteriorated into violence, the company officially abandoned the plans.

Red Bull GmbH then turned to the former West Germany. The company made contact with Hamburg-based cult club FC St. Pauli, known for its left-leaning supporters, and met representatives of the club to discuss a sponsorship deal. A short time before, supporters of FC St. Pauli had participated in protests against Red Bull's takeover of SV Austria Salzburg. Once it became clear to the Hamburg side that the company had plans that went far beyond conventional sponsoring, it immediately ended the contact, and the question never even made it to the club management. The company then made contact with TSV 1860 Munich. Negotiations began behind closed doors, but the club was not interested in an investment and ended the contact.

In 2007, Red Bull GmbH made plans to invest in Fortuna Düsseldorf, a traditional club with more than 100 years of history. The plans became public and it was revealed that the company wanted to acquire more than 50 percent of the shares. Rumors spread that the company wanted to rename the club "Red Bull Düsseldorf" or similar. The plans were immediately met with wild protests from club supporters. As with FC Sachsen Leipzig, the plans also ran into legal difficulties: the statutes of the DFB did not allow to change a club name for advertising purposes or an external investor to obtain a majority of votes.
Eventually, the plans were soundly rejected by club members. The company turned back to the former East Germany.

Leipzig was considered a most favourable place for an investment. The potential for establishing a new club in Leipzig seemed huge. The city had a rich history in football, being the meeting place for the founding of the DFB and the home of the first German national football champions, VfB Leipzig. During East Germany's existence, local teams such as 1. FC Lokomotive Leipzig and its rival, BSG Chemie Leipzig, played at the highest level of the East German football league system, even on international level. The current state of football was, however, poor. No team from the city had played in the Bundesliga since 1994, and no team had played in a professional league since 1998. The two best teams would soon both play in the Oberliga, and local football was plagued by fan violence. The city hungered for top-level football. Leipzig had a population of around 500,000 inhabitants. The city thus had a considerable economic strength and fan potential. At the same time, there were no Bundesliga clubs within a wide area from the city, which further strengthened the possibility to attract sponsors and fans.

In Leipzig, exemplary infrastructure could also be found. The city had a large airport, motorway connections and most importantly: a large modern football stadium. The Zentralstadion was a former 2006 FIFA World Cup venue and the second largest football stadium in the east of Germany, after the Olympiastadion in Berlin.

An investment in a club playing in one of the top divisions in Germany would have been a costly affair. From previous experiences, the company knew that the existing traditions of such club would be a disadvantage. It also knew that an investment in a club playing in one of the top divisions would meet legal difficulties. Such investment would thus be risky. Instead, the company found that a newly established club, designed for the company, would be the better option for an investment. In the beginning of 2009, Red Bull GmbH contacted the Saxony Football Association (SFV), to find out about the procedure to establish a new club in Saxony.

A new established club would need teams and a playing right. If it did not acquire a playing right from another club, it would have to start playing in the lowest tier league, the Kreisklasse. The company searched for a club playing in the Oberliga, since 2008 the fifth tier in the German football league system and therefore no longer subject to the DFB licensing system. By proposal from Michael Kölmel, the company found SSV Markranstädt, a small club from a town thirteen kilometers west of Leipzig. The club was positively inclined to entering a partnership with a global company. Its chairman Holger Nussbaum wanted to secure the club's long term finances and designed a plan to engage Red Bull GmbH. Holger Nussbaum presented his plan to Michael Kölmel, who saw his chance and decided to join. Assisted by Michael Kölmel, Red Bull GmbH began negotiations with SSV Markranstädt. Only five weeks after the first contact, SSV Markranstädt had agreed to sell its playing right for the Oberliga to Red Bull GmbH. The cost has not been disclosed, but SSV Markranstädt is believed to have received a compensation of 350,000 euro.

RasenBallsport Leipzig e.V. was founded on 19 May 2009. All seven founding members were either employees or agents of Red Bull GmbH. Andreas Sadlo was elected chairman, and Joachim Krug was hired as sporting director. Andreas Sadlo was a well known football player agent, working for the agency "Stars & Friends". In order to avoid future objections from the German Football Association (DFB), he resigned as player agent, before taking position as chairman. The statutes of the DFB would not allow a player agent to be involved in the operating affairs of a club. Joachim Krug had earlier been employed as coach and manager by Rot Weiss Ahlen, which by that time was known as LR Ahlen and sponsored by cosmetics manufacturer LR International.

RB Leipzig became the fifth football commitment in the Red Bull sporting portfolio, following FC Red Bull Salzburg in Austria, the New York Red Bulls in the United States, Red Bull Brasil in Brazil and Red Bull Ghana in Ghana. In contrast with previous clubs, RB Leipzig did not bear the corporate name. The statutes of the DFB would not permit the corporate name to be included in the club name. Instead, the club adopted the unusual name "RasenBallsport", literally meaning "Lawn Ball Sports". But through the use of the initials "RB", which corresponds to the initials of the company, the corporate identity could still be recognized.

RB Leipzig began with a partnership with fifth division side SSV Markranstädt. The partnership meant that SSV Markranstädt would provide the initial core of RB Leipzig, as the basis for its leap into German football. RB Leipzig acquired the playing right for the Oberliga, the top three men's teams and a senior men's team from SSV Markranstädt. The first team was completely taken over, with its training staff and its head coach Tino Vogel, the son of former East German football legend Eberhard Vogel.

The transfer of the playing right for the Oberliga had to be approved by the North East German Football Association (NOFV). RB Leipzig would need at least four junior teams, including an A-junior team, to finally obtain the playing right. SSV Markranstädt had retained its junior department and RB Leipzig lacked junior teams. Red Bull GmbH therefore approached FC Sachsen Leipzig. The club was again in financial difficulties and could no longer finance its youth department. The NOFV approved the transfer of the playing right on 13 June 2009 and RB Leipzig was given one year to complete its number of junior teams. The club then acquired four junior teams from FC Sachsen Leipzig. The acquisition was urged by the Saxony Football Association (SFV), in order to prevent a migration of talents.

RB Leipzig would play its inaugural season in the Oberliga at the Stadion am Bad in Markranstädt. The stadium held 5,000 seats and was the traditional home ground of SSV Markranstädt. The plans were however that the first team would quickly move to the far larger Zentralstadion, hopefully in 2010, after an advance to the Regionalliga. The stadium was owned by Michael Kölmel who was known to Red Bull GmbH for years and had assisted the establishment of RB Leipzig as a negotiation partner. Michael Kölmel had previously also been involved in local football himself, as a sponsor of FC Sachsen Leipzig. He was eager to find a strong tenant for the stadium, which last saw FC Sachsen Leipzig play in the Regionalliga behind closed doors. Negotiations between Red Bull GmbH and Michael Kölmel began immediately at the club's founding. Red Bull GmbH reserved the naming right to the stadium in June 2009, meaning that the name could not be sold to anyone else.

On its founding, RB Leipzig aimed to play first division Bundesliga football within eight years. Following the model previously elaborated by Red Bull GmbH in Austria and the US, the club was set to emerge and quickly rise through the divisions. It was predicted that Red Bull GmbH would invest 100 million euro in the club over a period of ten years, and Dietrich Mateschitz openly spoke of the possibility of winning the German championship in the long run. The last team from Leipzig to do so was VfB Leipzig in 1903.

2009–2016: Rise through the divisions
After some previously scheduled games had to be canceled due to safety concerns, RB Leipzig played its first match on 10 July 2009, a friendly match against the Landesliga club SV Bannewitz. The match was played at the Stadion am Bad in Markranstädt and ended with a 5–0 win for RB Leipzig. The club played its first competitive match on 31 July 2009, in the first round of Saxony Cup against VfK Blau–Weiß Leipzig. After switching sides, RB Leipzig played as the home team and won the match 5–0. The club then played its first league match in an away match against FC Carl Zeiss Jena II on 8 August 2009. The match ended 1–1.

During the further course of the season, RB Leipzig suffered its first defeat on 13 September 2009, in a match against Budissa Bautzen. Despite minor setbacks, the club still managed to be crowned as Herbstmeister, standing at first place after the first half of the 2009–10 season. The team came back even stronger for the second half of the season, having signed the experienced midfielder and 2. Bundesliga player Timo Rost from Energie Cottbus in January 2010. The team managed to secure first place in the 2009–10 NOFV–Oberliga Süd at the 25th matchday, thus earning promotion to the 2010–11 Regionalliga Nord. The team finished the season with an impressive goal difference of 74–17, having suffered only two defeats. The playing right for the Regionalliga was issued by the DFB on 4 May 2010. RB Leipzig targeted a place in the 2010–11 DFB–Pokal, which would have been won by winning the 2009–10 Saxony Cup. The team reached the quarterfinals in the Saxony Cup, but was eliminated after a defeat against FSV Zwickau on 13 November 2009.

The incumbent chairman, Andreas Saldo, left the club in January 2010 and the position was assumed by the former Hamburger SV sporting director and incumbent sporting director for the common Red Bull football commitment Dietmar Beiersdorfer. One day after the last match of the 2009–10 season, Beiersdorfer released head coach Tino Vogel, assistant coach Lars Weißenberger and sporting director Joachim Krug from their positions. This action was done after Red Bull owner Dietrich Mateschitz had announced a change in strategy. According to the new strategy, RB Leipzig was going to represent the key project in the football commitment of the company, in place of FC Red Bull Salzburg. Tomas Oral was announced as the new head coach on 18 June 2010.

The players Christian Mittenzwei, Sebastian Hauck, Stefan Schumann, Toni Jurascheck and Michael Lerchl did not receive new contracts for the following Regionalliga season, while players Frank Räbsch, Ronny Kujat and two other players ended their careers.

Before entry to the Regionalliga, there were two significant changes in the club. The club returned the second, third and fourth team to SSV Markranstädt. In order to replace the reserve team, the club adopted the first team of ESV Delitzsch as its reserve team and purchased its playing right for the Bezirksliga Leipzig. The first team moved from the Stadion am Bad in Markranstädt, to make the Zentralstadion in Leipzig its new home arena. The former 2006 FIFA World Cup venue was simultaneously renamed Red Bull Arena. The opening of the Red Bull Arena was celebrated on 24 July 2010 with a friendly match against the German vice-champions FC Schalke 04 in front of 21,566 spectators. The match ended with a 1–2 loss for RB Leipzig. The first team played its last game at the Stadion am Bad six days later on 30 July 2010, a friendly match against Hertha BSC, which ended with a 2–1 win for RB Leipzig.

The 2010–11 Regionalliga season started with a series of draws, the first one on 6 August 2010 against Türkiyemspor Berlin in front of 4,028 spectators at the Red Bull Arena. The first win came at the 4th matchday, in an away match against Holstein Kiel, which ended 1–2 for RB Leipzig. The first home win came immediately after, at the 5th matchday, in a match against 1. FC Magdeburg, which ended 2–1 for RB Leipzig. After a moderate start to the season, the club found itself chasing Chemnitzer FC, which was considered a possible candidate for promotion. At the end of the year, RB Leipzig confirmed its ambitions to gain promotion, by signing Brazilian midfielder Thiago Rockenbach. The club had signed forward Carsten Kammlott, considered a promising young talent, and the experienced Leipzig born defender Tim Sebastian, during the summer.

The club finished its first season in the Regionalliga in 4th place, thus missing out on promotion. However, under coach Tomas Oral, the club succeeded in winning the 2010–11 Saxony Cup after defeating Chemnitzer FC 1–0 in the final on 1 June 2011 in front of 13,958 spectators at the Red Bull Arena. By winning the 2010–11 Saxony Cup, the club won its first title in club history. It also qualified to participate in the 2011–12 DFB-Pokal. Because the club missed out on promotion during the second half of the 2010–11 season, Peter Pacult from Rapid Wien was announced as the new head coach for the 2011–12 season on 4 May 2011. Almost simultaneously, the club announced that sporting director Thomas Linke had been released from his position, having been employed for only 10 weeks, from February 2011. Various media suspected a connection between the signing of Pacult and the departure of Linke.

Also, several players left the team, among them Lars Müller, Sven Neuhaus, Thomas Kläsener and Nico Frommer, all participants in the previous Saxony Cup final. With Daniel Rosin, Timo Rost and Benjamin Bellot, only three players from the former Oberliga team remained in the team for the 2011–12 Regionalliga season, while the former international Ingo Hertzsch as a fourth of these players remained in the club. Hertzsch ended his professional career after the 2010–11 season, but went on to join the reserve team, RB Leipzig II, and the RB Leipzig business operation. On 29 July 2011, RB Leipzig made its debut in the DFB-Pokal, in front of 31,212 spectators at the Red Bull Arena. The team managed to knock Bundesliga club VfL Wolfsburg out of the first round of the cup, beating them 3–2 after a hat-trick by Daniel Frahn. The team was eliminated in the next round, defeated 0–1 by FC Augsburg. The 2011–12 Regionalliga season saw the largest win in club history, when RB Leipzig defeated SV Wilhelmshaven 8–2 on 19 February 2012. After a decisive 2–2 draw against VfL Wolfsburg II at the 33rd matchday, the club missed out on promotion for the second time in the Regionalliga, finishing the season in 3rd place.

The 2012–13 season in the reformed Regionalliga Nordost began with major personnel changes. Former Schalke 04 head coach Ralf Rangnick was introduced as the new sporting director. Coinciding with his arrival, he replaced head coach Peter Pacult with former SG Sonnenhof Großaspach coach Alexander Zorniger. The season proved more successful than the previous two. The club won the Herbstmeister title with two matchdays left of the first half of the season, after defeating FSV Zwickau 1–0 away. The team then went on to secure first place in the 2012–13 Regionalliga Nordost at the 18th matchday, after the second placed club FC Carl Zeiss Jena lost a match against Berliner AK 07 on 7 May 2013 and, as a consequence, were no longer able to overtake RB.

The 2012–13 Saxony Cup was another success. The club reached the final for the second time in club history and, as in 2011, the opponent was Chemnitzer FC. The team won the final on 15 May 2013 by 4–2 in front of 16,864 spectators at the Red Bull Arena. The crowd number set a new record for a Saxony Cup final, breaking the previous record from 2011. By winning the 2012–13 Saxony Cup, the club was also qualified to participate in the 2013–14 DFB-Pokal. As the winner of the 2012–13 Regionallig Nordost, RB Leipzig won a place in the qualification for the 3. Liga. The club was drawn against Sportfreunde Lotte from the Regionalliga West. RB Leipzig won the first leg on 29 May 2013 by 2–0. The match was played at the Red Bull Arena in front of 30,104 spectators, a crowd number which set a new record for matches in the 4th division.

The second leg was played on 2 June 2013 and ended 2–2 after two goals to RB Leipzig during extra time. The result meant that RB Leipzig had finally won promotion to the 3. Liga, after three seasons in the Regionalliga. In the 2013–14 season, RB Leipzig made its first appearance in the 3. Liga in club history. The club signed Anthony Jung from FSV Frankfurt, Tobias Willers from Sportfreunde Lotte, Joshua Kimmich from the U19 team of VfB Stuttgart, André Luge from FSV Zwickau, Christos Papadimitriou from AEK Athens, Yussuf Poulsen from Lyngby BK and Denis Thomalla from TSG 1899 Hoffenheim during the summer.

RB Leipzig was eliminated by FC Augsburg in the first round of the 2013–14 DFB-Pokal on 2 August 2013 after losing 0–2 at the Red Bull Arena. The defeat brought an end to a year-long series without defeat in competitive matches. The 2013–14 3. Liga had a more promising start. The team won its first match, against Hallescher FC away, by 1–0 on 19 July 2013 and kept an undefeated streak until 31 August 2013, when the team lost 1–2 to first placed team SV Wehen Wiesbaden away. On 5 October 2013, RB Leipzig again met the first placed team. SV Wehen Wiesbaden had lost its first-place position to 1. FC Heidenheim only one week after its defeat of RB Leipzig. 1. FC Heidenheim would defend it until the end of the season. RB Leipzig defeated 1. FC Heidenheim by 2–0 after a convincing performance at the Voith-Arena and climbed to third place. During the winter break, players Christos Papadimitriou, Juri Judt, Carsten Kammlott and Bastian Schulz left the team. In return, the team was joined by Diego Demme from SC Paderborn 07, Federico Palacios Martínez from VfL Wolfsburg, Mikko Sumusalo from HJK Helsinki and Georg Teigl from FC Red Bull Salzburg.

After losing 1–2 away to MSV Duisburg on 1 February 2014, the team would not concede a single defeat for the rest of the season. A thrilling duel with SV Darmstadt 98 appeared, with both teams fighting for the crucial second place. The two teams met at the 35th matchday, on 19 April 2014. RB Leipzig came out as the winner, defeating SV Darmstadt 98 by 1–0 in front of 39,147 spectators at the Red Bull Arena. RB Leipzig secured the second place and direct promotion to the 2. Bundesliga two weeks later, after defeating last placed team 1. FC Saarbrücken 5–1 in front of a nearly sold out Red Bull Arena on 3 May 2014. The crowd of 42,713 spectators set a new club record.

By finishing the season in second place, RB Leipzig won promotion to the 2. Bundesliga and became the first team since the introduction of the 3. Liga to win promotion to the 2. Bundesliga after only one season. Following promotion to the 2. Bundesliga, the organization responsible for licensing was no longer the DFB, but instead the German Football League (DFL). The DFL announced its first decision in the licensing process on 22 April 2014. RB Leipzig was to be given a license for the 2014–15 2. Bundesliga season, but only under certain conditions. Criticism mounted that the club lacked in participation, that club management was too concentrated in only a handful of people and that the club was not independent enough from Red Bull GmbH. To ensure independence and improve participation, the DFL set up three requirements that the club had to meet in order to obtain a license for the 2014–15 2. Bundesliga season. One of the requirements was to redesign the crest, as the crest too closely resembled the corporate logo of Red Bull GmbH. A second requirement was to change the composition of the club's organizational bodies. A third requirement was to lower the membership fees and open up the association for new members. The German legal magazine Legal Tribune Online assessed all three requirements set up by the DFL as legally questionable.

RB Leipzig filed an appeal on 30 April 2014. Sporting director Ralf Rangnick appeared in media and expressed his willingness to reach a compromise with the DFL, saying that important is not what is written on the jersey, but what is inside. The appeal was rejected in a second decision by the DFL on 8 May 2014. Red Bull GmbH owner Dietrich Mateschitz spoke out in media, openly criticizing the decision by the DFL. He described the requirements as a "decapitation request" and categorically rejected another season in the 3. Liga, ultimately threatening to end the project in Leipzig if the license was not given.

RB Leipzig filed a second appeal on 12 May 2014. The DFL licensing committee was set to make a decision on the second appeal on 15 May 2014, before making its final decision on 28 May 2014. Sporting director Ralf Rangnick confirmed that the club was still in talks with the DFL and expressed optimism around the license. On 15 May 2014 a compromise was announced. The compromise meant that the club had to redesign its crest and ensure that club management was independent from Red Bull GmbH.

The club signed numerous players before the 2014–15 season, among them Rani Khedira from VfB Stuttgart, Lukas Klostermann from VfL Bochum, Marcel Sabitzer from FC Red Bull Salzburg, Terrence Boyd from Rapid Wien and Massimo Bruno from RSC Anderlecht. Several players also left the team. Massimo Bruno and Marcel Sabitzer were immediately transferred on loan to FC Red Bull Salzburg. Fabian Bredlow was transferred on loan to FC Liefering, André Luge was transferred on loan to SV Elversberg and Thiago Rockenbach Silva joined Hertha BSC II as a free agent. The club spent an estimated sum of approximately 12 million euros on new players during the summer of 2014. The sum was large enough to put the club in 8th place of all clubs in the Bundesliga and 2. Bundesliga, thus spending more than half of all clubs in the first division.

RB Leipzig played a series of friendly matches during the 2014–15 pre-season. On 18 July 2014, the team defeated Paris Saint-Germain 4–2 in front of 35,796 spectators and 150 accredited journalists at the Red Bull Arena. The first goal was scored by Terrence Boyd, scoring his second goal in his second match for his new club. Terrence Boyd received the jersey of Zlatan Ibrahimović from Paris Saint-Germain after the match. On 26 July 2014, the team defeated Queens Park Rangers with 2–0 at the Stadion der Freundschaft in Gera. Both goals were scored by Yussuf Poulsen.

The 2014–15 2. Bundesliga season began with 0–0 draw against VfR Aalen on 2 August 2014, followed up by a couple of wins and another draw. The first defeat in the league came at the 6th matchday, losing 1–2 against 1. FC Union Berlin at the Red Bull Arena on 21 September 2014. After the 7th matchday, the club stood at second place in the league. RB Leipzig was drawn against SC Paderborn in the first round of the 2014–15 DFB-Pokal. The team won the match with 2–1 on extra time at the Red Bull Arena on 16 August 2014. In the second round, the club faced FC Erzgebirge Aue. The team won the match with 3–1 on extra time at the Red Bull Arena on 29 October 2015, and qualified for the round of 16 for first time in club history. RB Leipzig then released its own club magazine Klub on 6 October 2014.

After a series of disappointing results, the club had dropped down to 7th place by the 13th matchday. On 23 November 2014, RB Leipzig defeated FC St. Pauli 4–1 in front of 38,660 spectators at the Red Bull Arena. Two goals were scored by Terrence Boyd and the club climbed to 5th place. The success, however, was followed by a draw against SV Sandhausen. On 7 December 2014, the team met first placed team FC Ingolstadt. RB Leipzig lost 0–1, and the result meant that the club now stood at 8th place. RB Leipzig strengthened the team during the winter break by signing Omer Damari from Austria Wien, Emil Forsberg from Malmö FF and players Rodnei and Yordy Reyna from FC Red Bull Salzburg. The club spent an estimated sum of 10,7 million euros on new players during the winter break, a sum which covered almost all transfer expenditures during the period for the whole of 2. Bundesliga.

On 6 February 2015, the club lost 2–0 to Erzgebirge Aue. As a consequence, the club had now played four matches without a win and had lost contact with the top placed teams. On the following Tuesday evening, the club summoned Alexander Zorninger to a meeting, and on Tuesday night, the club took the decision to part ways with him after the season. The decision had been taken by the club management in consultation with Red Bull GmbH owner Dietrich Mateschitz. The next morning, Alexander Zorniger announced his own decision to leave immediately. The club received criticism for its decision. Under Alexander Zorniger, the club had risen from the Regionalliga to the 2. Bundesliga. The decision was considered merciless by some media. Incumbent RB Leipzig U17 coach Achim Beierlorzer was announced as interim head coach for the rest of the season.

On 5 March 2015, RB Leipzig met VfL Wolfsburg in the third round of the 2014–15 DFB-Pokal. The club was eliminated after being defeated 2–0 at the Red Bull Arena. The match was attended by 43,348 spectators. It was the first time in club history that the stadium had been completely sold out. The preferred candidate of sporting director Ralf Rangnick as new head coach from the summer was former Mainz 05 coach Thomas Tuchel, but the negotiations with Tuchel failed. Another candidate was Bayer Leverkusen junior coach Sascha Lewandowski, but he too declined the offer. In May 2015, sporting director Ralf Rangnick was himself announced as new head coach from the summer, with Achim Beierlorzer as his assistant. Ralf Rangnick was planned to serve this double job for one season. RB Leipzig finished the 2014–15 2. Bundesliga season in fifth place.

Before the 2015–16 season, RB Leipzig invested further in strengthening the team, signing Davie Selke from Werder Bremen, Atınç Nukan from Beşiktaş, Marcel Halstenberg from FC St. Pauli and Willi Orban from 1. FC Kaiserslautern. Selke was signed for an estimated €8 million, Nukan for an estimated €5 million and Halstenberg for an estimated €3 million. Meanwhile, Joshua Kimmich was sold to Bayern Munich and Rodnei left to join 1860 Munich as free agent. RB Leipzig also made transfers with its unofficial sister club, FC Red Bull Salzburg. As several times in the past, three players were signed on free transfer, among them the Austrian national Stefan Ilsanker. They were joined by Massimo Bruno and Marcel Sabitzer, returning to RB Leipzig from being on loan. These transfers provoked anger among the fans of FC Red Bull Salzburg. For several years FC Red Bull Salzburg had transferred some of its best players to RB Leipzig. Fans of FC Red Bull Salzburg were heard singing chants against RB Leipzig during a game in the ÖFB-Cup in April 2015, after Austrian media had reported that Stefan Ilsanker could move to Leipzig during the summer.

The signing of Davie Selke was record breaking, being the most expensive player ever signed in the history of the 2. Bundesliga. In total, the club spent a sum of approximately €18.6 million on new players during the summer of 2015, more than all other clubs in the 2. Bundesliga together. During the pre-season 2015–16, RB Leipzig defeated Southampton 5–4 in Bischofshofen on 8 July 2015, and Rubin Kazan 1–0 in Leogang on 12 July 2015. The team then went on to defeat Hapoel Tel Aviv 3–0 at the Red Bull Arena on 18 July 2015.

The club was drawn against VfL Osnabrück in the first round of the 2015–16 DFB-Pokal. The match was played at the Osnatel-Arena in Osnabrück on 10 August 2015. After Osnabrück scored in the first minute, the home fans celebrated so violently that barriers and safety net partially collapsed and the match had to be interrupted. The match was restarted and Osnabrück led the match into the second half. In the 71st minute, referee Martin Petersen was badly hit in the head by a lighter, thrown from the home stand. The lighter had been thrown after Petersen had tried to resolve an argument between Davie Selke and Osnabrück substitute Michael Hohnstedt, resulting from a controversial situation in the Osnabrück penalty area. The match was again interrupted, and later cancelled. RB Leipzig offered a replay, but the DFB decided the match to be counted as lost by Osnabrück 0–2. RB Leipzig later decided to waive 20,000 euros of the 50,500 euros VfL Osnabrück owed the club for its share of the revenues from the match. RB Leipzig also allowed the payment of the remaining 30,500 to be postponed until the next year.

In the midst of the 2015 European migrant crisis, the club, staff, players and fans of RB Leipzig showed support for refugees. In August 2015, RB Leipzig donated €50,000 to the City of Leipzig for its work with helping asylum seekers. The club also sold 60 containers from its training center, including sanitary facilities, to the city, in order to serve as accommodation for asylum seekers. The club had originally invested around €500,000 in the containers. Moreover, the club became patrons of the initiative "Willkommen im Fußball", giving refugee children the opportunity to play football. Staff and players of RB Leipzig collected and donated sporting equipment and private clothes to refugees. Also sporting director and head coach Ralf Rangnick participated in the donation, with personal concern for the commitment, citing his own background as being a child to refugees. His parents had met in a refugee camp at Glauchau, his father had fled from Königsberg and his mother from Breslau. By an initiative of fans, RB Leipzig invited refugees on free admission to watch its home match against SC Paderborn on 11 September 2015. 450 refugees attended the match, they were met and accompanied by 200 fans before the match.

RB Leipzig advanced to the second round of the DFB-Pokal, being eliminated after losing 3–0 to a strong playing SpVgg Unterhaching from the Regionalliga Bayern at the Alpenbauer Sportpark on 27 October 2015. After defeating SV Sandhausen 2–1 away at the 13th matchday on 1 November 2015, RB Leipzig stood at first place in the league. The position was however quickly lost already at the next matchday, with the team being surpassed by SC Freiburg and FC St. Pauli. But following a series of wins, the team recaptured the leading position on 13 December 2015. RB Leipzig made only few transfers during the winter break. Defender Tim Sebastian, who had been in the team since 2010 and who had once served as captain, left to join SC Paderborn, and midfielder Zsolt Kalmár left to join FSV Frankfurt on loan.

RB Leipzig held the leading position in the league until the 27th matchday, when it was again lost to SC Freiburg, after the team suffered a 3–1 defeat away against 1.FC Nürnberg on 20 March 2016. The team now stood at second place in the league, only three points ahead of 1. FC Nürnberg in third place. RB Leipzig then recorded two straight wins and expanded the distance to six points. But with only three matches left of the league season, the distance had shrunk to four points. RB Leipzig finally secured a second place in the league and direct promotion to the Bundesliga at the 33rd matchday, after defeating Karlsruher SC 2–0 in front of 42,559 spectators at the Red Bull Arena on 8 May 2016. The promotion was celebrated together with 20,000 supporters at the Market Square in front of the Old Town Hall in central Leipzig on 16 May 2016. The team was received before the celebration by Leipzig Mayor Burkhard Jung.

At the end of the season, Ralf Rangnick was to resign as head coach, in order to be able to focus on his job as sporting director. German media had during the season speculated in several potential candidates for new head coach, including Markus Gisdol, Sandro Schwarz, Jocelyn Gourvennec, René Weiler, and notably Markus Weinzierl. On 6 May 2016, Ralph Hasenhüttl was announced as new head coach. Ralph Hasenhüttl had successfully served as head coach of FC Ingolstadt 04 since October 2013, having brought the team from the bottom of the 2. Bundesliga to the Bundesliga, and also managed to defend the spot in top tier during the 2015–16 season.

2016–present: Bundesliga era

RB Leipzig remained undefeated in the first thirteen league matches of the 2016–17 season, breaking a record for the longest undefeated streak of a promoted team to the Bundesliga. The team finished the 11th matchday in first place, and became the first team from the area of former East Germany to hold the leading position since the 1991–92 Bundesliga season, when Hansa Rostock stood at first place on 31 August 1991 and held the position for three matchdays, relinquishing it after a loss against FC Ingolstadt.

RB Leipzig became the first Bundesliga debutant, since the German reunification, to qualify for a European tournament, following a 4–0 win against SC Freiburg on 15 April 2017. They also became the first team from the area of former East Germany to qualify for a European tournament, since 1. FC Union Berlin qualified for the 2001–02 UEFA Cup. Subsequently, Leipzig managed to qualify for the 2017–18 UEFA Champions League after beating Hertha BSC 4–1 at the Olympiastadion on 6 May 2017, two days before the anniversary of the club's promotion to Bundesliga.	

The following season, Leipzig finished in 6th position and also reached the quarterfinals of the 2017–18 UEFA Europa League competition, after being transferred from the 2017–18 UEFA Champions League group stage, which was finished in 3rd position. On 16 May 2018, Ralph Hasenhüttl resigned as head coach, after an extension of his contract was denied. Before the next season, Rangnick was announced as new coach for one year, to be followed by Julian Nagelsmann by the beginning of the 2019–20 season.
RB Leipzig finished the 2018–19 Bundesliga season in 3rd position, with a total of 66 points. This ensured them qualification in the 2019–20 UEFA Champions League. In addition, a win against Hamburger SV on 23 April 2019, RB Leipzig reached the DFB-Pokal final for the first time, where they faced Bayern Munich on 25 May. However, RB Leipzig were defeated by Bayern Munich 3–0. On 1 June 2019, Rangnick announced his resignation as sporting director of RB Leipzig after seven years and moved to the Red Bull company as "Head of Sport and Development Soccer". His successor as sporting director was Markus Krösche.

In the 2019–20 UEFA Champions League, RB Leipzig managed to win their group ahead of Lyon, Benfica and Zenit Saint Petersburg. After beating Tottenham Hotspur 4–0 on aggregate in the Round of 16, Leipzig then went on to record a 2–1 victory over Atlético Madrid in the quarter-finals thanks to the late goal of American midfielder Tyler Adams to reach the semi-finals of the competition for the first time in its history. However, RB Leipzig lost 3–0 to Paris Saint-Germain in the semi-finals.

Under coach Domenico Tedesco, RB Leipzig reached the semi-finals of the 2021–22 UEFA Europa League, in which they were eliminated by Rangers 3–2 on aggregate, and won their first major title in the DFB-Pokal Final 4–2 on penalties against SC Freiburg. On 30 July 2022, RB Leipzig faced Bayern Munich in their first DFL Supercup at the Red Bull Arena where they lost 5–3. On 7 September 2022, Tedesco was sacked following a 4–1 home defeat against Shakhtar Donetsk in the opening match of the 2022–23 UEFA Champions League.

Colours and crest 
 
RB Leipzig play in the traditional red and white colours of Red Bull football teams. All crests proposed at the club's founding were rejected by the Saxony Football Association (SFV), as they were considered copies of the corporate logo of Red Bull GmbH. The team therefore played its inaugural season in 2009–10 without a crest. RB Leipzig later proposed a new crest, which was eventually accepted by the SFV in May 2010. The crest was slightly different from the crests used by other Red Bull football teams. The two bulls had been altered in shape and a few strokes added. The crest was used from the 2010–11 Regionalliga season until the end of the 2013–14 3. Liga season. It was however rejected by the German Football League (DFL) during the license procedure for the 2014–15 2. Bundesliga season. As part of a compromise with the DFL, the club agreed to redesign its crest and introduced the current crest. The current crest is significantly different from the crests used by other Red Bull football teams, although it is identical to the modified crest used by FC Red Bull Salzburg for international matches and due to UEFA regulations. The yellow sun has been changed in favor of a football and the initials of "RasenBallsport" have been relocated to the bottom of the crest and are no longer highlighted in red.

Kit suppliers and shirt sponsors

Stadium

RB Leipzig played its inaugural season in 2009–10 at the Stadion am Bad in Markranstädt. The stadium held 5,000 seats and was the traditional home ground of SSV Markranstädt. The plans were however that the first team would quickly move to the far larger Zentralstadion, hopefully in 2010, after an advance to the Regionalliga. Red Bull GmbH reserved the naming right to the stadium at the club's founding, meaning that the name could not be sold to anyone else. The company negotiated the acquisition of the naming right during the successful 2009–10 season and the proposed new name was approved by the City of Leipzig on 25 March 2010. Red Bull GmbH then acquired the naming right and the Zentralstadion was renamed "Red Bull Arena" on 1 July 2010. The contract runs until 2040. The inauguration was held on 24 July 2010, in a friendly match against Schalke 04, in front of 21,566 spectators.

Red Bull Arena had a capacity of 44,345 seats during the 2014–15 season. In March 2015, RB Leipzig announced that it was going to invest 5 million euros in a redevelopment of the stadium, including an expansion of the VIP area, pressbox and wheelchair spaces. It also included two new larger LED score boards and refurbished player facilities. The VIP area was expanded from 700 seats to approximately 1400 seats. The capacity of Red Bull Arena was reduced to 42,959 seats before the 2015–16 season, due to redevelopment of various stadium areas.

The Red Bull Arena was an all-seater stadium for a long time. Home supporters are located in sector B. During the general meeting of the supporters' union in 2014, the assembly made a demand to convert sector B into a standing area. However, it was considered impossible to convert sector B into a standing area at the time, for structural reasons. Sector B was eventually converted into a standing area in the 2021–22 season.

Attendances
The 29 July 2011 first round 3–2 victory over VfL Wolfsburg was the club's first appearance in the 2011–12 DFB-Pokal; the 31,212 spectators gathered marked a club attendance record for the Red Bull Arena. The record did not stand long though; on 25 October 2011 Leipzig were defeated 1–0 by FC Augsburg, this second-round game of the DFB-Pokal set a new record attendance of 34,341 spectators.

The last home game of the 2013–14 3. Liga season on 3 May 2014 was a chance for RB Leipzig to secure direct promotion to the 2. Bundesliga; Leipzig romped home emphatically winning 5–1 against 1. FC Saarbrücken in a near-sell out capacity Red Bull Arena, in front of a record 42,713 spectators. The 43,348 spectators who watched the third round of the 2014–15 DFB-Pokal against VfL Wolfsburg on 4 March 2015, sold out the Red Bull Arena for the first time, setting the current club record for a match at the Red Bull Arena as of 2016.

RB Leipzig holds two attendance records. The 2011 Saxony Cup final against Chemnitzer FC on 1 June 2011 at the Red Bull Arena was attended by 13,958 spectators. The attendance set a new record for a Saxony Cup final. The record was broken two years later, once again in a final between RB Leipzig and Chemnizer FC. The 2013 Saxony Cup final against Chemnitzer FC on 15 May 2013 at the Red Bull Arena was attended by 16,864 spectators. The second attendance record held by RB Leipzig was set during the 2012–13 season, in the qualification for the 3. Liga. The qualifying match against Sportfreunde Lotte on 29 May 2013 at the Red Bull Arena was attended by 30,104 spectators. The attendance set a new record for a match in the fourth tier of the German football league system.

RB Leipzig played its hundredth match at the Red Bull Arena on 4 October 2015, against 1. FC Nürnberg. At that point, the club reported a total attendance of 1,464,215 spectators, or an average of 14,643 spectators, for matches at the Red Bull Arena.

Their first Bundesliga home match was played on 10 September 2016 versus Borussia Dortmund in front of 42,558 spectators. In their debut season, the team averaged 41,454 spectators, or 97% of the stadium's capacity.

Average home league attendances

Expansion
In October 2014, German media reported that the club wanted to expand the Red Bull Arena to 55,000 seats for future first division Bundesliga play. An expansion to 55,000 seats would make the stadium one of the ten largest football venues in Germany. Who was to finance such an expansion remained unclear. German media considered that a possible option was that Red Bull GmbH buy the stadium to make the investments itself, but it was also considered unlikely that the current owner would be prepared to sell the stadium, which had just turned profitable.

The club had previously reserved an area near the A14 motorway north of Leipzig, close to the Leipzig/Halle Airport, which could be used to build a completely new stadium. It could also be used to put pressure on the current owner of the Red Bull Arena to agree to an expansion. In March 2015, German media reported the club considered building a new stadium on the area north of Leipzig. It could be modeled after the Veltins-Arena in Gelsenkirchen or the Esprit Arena in Düsseldorf, with a significantly larger capacity than Red Bull arena, possibly up to 80,000 seats.

The current owner of Red Bull Arena, Michael Kölmel, commented on plans to build a new stadium in an interview in August 2015. He pointed out how a new stadium on the outskirts of Leipzig could be detrimental to fan culture, and said that Red Bull Arena could be expanded to 55,000 seats, or even more.

In October 2015, expansion of the Red Bull Arena was back on the agenda. New plans were made to expand the stadium to 57,000 seats, involving Viennese architect Albert Wimmer. Reconstruction could start over the summer break of 2016. In January 2016, the club decided to put the plans on hold, at least until 2017.

In February 2016, German newspaper Leipziger Volkszeitung reported that club management again considered the possibility of building a new stadium with a capacity of 80,000 seats north of Leipzig. However, a prerequisite for such a project would be that ticket demand exceed the supply of seats in the Red Bull Arena significantly and sustainably. A move to a new stadium could be possible in 2020, when the club's current contract to lease the Red Bull Arena expires.

In December 2016, RB Leipzig offered that the stadium would be sold by former owner Michael Kölmel to the club to continue the plans from the 2015 agenda. Due to the transfer of the arena into ownership of Red Bull, a new stadium would not be pursued. It was planned, that the stadium would expand to a total of 53,840 seats as of summer 2021, beginning from November 2018, when construction works started. However, the plans were changed during construction and the expansion work was completed in 2021 with a total capacity of 47,069 spectators, of which 37,069 can be seated, at national competitions.

Training center
In 2010, Red Bull announced its intention to engage long term in Leipzig. In this context the club sought a location for a training center and a youth academy. Towards the end of the year, the club made concrete plans to invest 30 million euros in a training center comprising six pitches, offices and a youth academy. The training center was to be located at Cottaweg, partly on the area of the naturally protected riparian forest Leipziger Auwald and the site of the traditional fair Leipziger Kleinmesse. The plans met objections and concerns from environmental organizations and from the current users of the area, a Leipzig fairground association and the football club BSV Schönau 1983. After negotiations, the City of Leipzig agreed to the plans on 15 December 2010. RB Leipzig and the city of Leipzig later announced that the club was going to invest in an area of 92,000 square meters.

The construction was to be carried out in two phases and began in March 2011. During the first phase, three natural turf pitches, one artificial turf pitch and an artificial hill for physical exercises were built. All four pitches were installed with floodlights, irrigation system and soil heating. Pitch one was also provided with four 38-meter masts producing HD-compatible lightning for optimal television broadcasts. Locker rooms, sanitary facilities and weight rooms were installed in 60 containers, totaling 720 square meters. The first section of the training center was opened in August 2011.

The second phase of construction began in January 2014. The plans for the second phase were set to create one of Germany's largest training centers for an estimated cost of 35 million euros. Involved in the project was the Dortmund based architect Christoph Helbich, who had previously been involved in the building of a new training center for Borussia Dortmund. For the second phase, the training center was to be expanded with two pitches, an area for goalkeeping practices and a three-story 13,500 square meters sports complex, meant to offer amenities for all RB Leipzig teams, from the U8 team to the professional team. In addition, pitch one was to be provided with a covered grandstand with at least 1,000 seats, for A- and B-junior matches.

The new sports complex was opened in September 2015 and taken in use by the professional team and six junior teams, from U14 to the reserve team. It contains an 800 square meters indoor hall, an indoor tartan track for sprint exercises, weight rooms, cold chambers, a spa area, medical facilities and individual relaxation rooms for each professional player. It also houses a media center, new offices, a boarding school for 50 youth players and a café for parents and fans. The RB Leipzig training center with its sports complex is considered one of the most unique and modern in Germany.

Constructed in the spring of 2016 was a covered grandstand with 1,000 seats, an area for motor skills-training and a parking area. The artificial hill for physical exercises, humorously called the "Felix Magath Memorial Hill", was also reconstructed.

The club has already plans for even further expansions of the training center. The club wants to build an additional pitch to the south of the training center. Such expansion would require more ground from the Leipziger Kleinmesse, and is therefore met with several objections. More certain is a future expansion to the north of the training center. This area is used by the football club BSV Schönau 1983 and the tennis club TC Grün-Weiß Leipzig. BSV Schönau 1983 has a contract to lease the area until 2026. The club ceded parts of its grounds to RB Leipzig in 2011. For this, the club received compensation. In total, RB Leipzig spent 900,000 euros for the construction of new grounds for BSC Schönau 1983. The area currently leased by BSV Schönau 1983 is already pledged to RB Leipzig when the lease contract ends in 2026.

Supporters

Fanclubs and minor ultras
RB Leipzig has 62 official fanclubs as of November 2021. The first two to become registered as official fanclubs were L.E Bulls and Bulls Club, both registered in 2009. L.E Bulls is the oldest official fanclub, but Bulls Club claims to be the biggest. There are also several non-official fanclubs, such as Rasenballisten and Fraktion Red Pride. RB Leipzig also has a minor ultras scene with groups such as Red Aces and Lecrats. The German newspaper Mitteldeutsche Zeitung reported that RB Leipzig had 5,000 organized supporters by March 2016.

The different fan clubs and supporter groups are organized in the supporter union Fanverband RB Leipzig Fans. The supporter union was founded in 2013. It is an umbrella organization for official fan clubs, unofficial fan clubs and other supporter groups. 25 supporter groups are currently organized in the supporter union, as of 2016. Each supporter group in the supporter union is represented by two representatives. The representatives of the supporter groups meet every 4 to 6 weeks. The supporter union also holds a general meeting once per year. Even fans that are not members of a supporter group are welcome at the general meeting. The supporter union is represented by five to seven fan representatives, elected every second year. A maximum of five fan representatives are elected by the representatives of the supporter groups, two additional fan representatives are elected by the general assembly. A core function of the fan representatives is to serve as a direct link to the club. The fan representatives can hold talks with club officials, for example, to communicate requests, suggestions and criticism from the supporter base. In order to divide the work of the fan representatives, the supporter union has also created several working groups. The first general meeting was held in November 2014 and gathered 350 supporters. Present were also club officials, such as general manager Ulrich Wolter.

Several German newspapers have noted the emergence of distinctly nonconformist supporter groups at the Red Bull Arena. In January 2012, Leipziger Internet Zeitung reported on the appearance of ultra group Red Aces. The group members were said to see themselves as "Rasenballisten" and determined not to leave the supporter base solely to Red Bull GmbH. In May 2014, Der Tagesspiegel reported on supporter group IG Rasenballisten. The group was said to highly value the name "RasenBallsport" and to be committed to give the club an identity beyond that offered by Red Bull GmbH. In the forefront, the group put the city of Leipzig. In April 2015, Zeit reported further on this phenomenon, notably supporter groups IG Rasenballisten and Lecrats. Their central idea was described as "Rasenballismus", stressing the Leipzig identity and the importance of impassioned fans. Lecrats was described as geared towards the anti-commercial values of the ultra culture and as critics of Red Bull GmbH. IG Rasenballisten and the ultra groups were said to consciously avoid the reductions that apply to official fanclubs and to reject official club merchandise and the commercial name of the stadium. In February 2015, the supporter group IG Rasenballisten became a registered voluntary association. The group had previously functioned as an interest community for other groups and individuals in the Red Bull Arena. Mitteldeutsche Zeitung reported that the group describes itself as uniting fanatical and critical fans of RB Lepizig. Members of Rasenballisten said that the group doesn't hesitate to criticize Red Bull GmbH, when found necessary, and stated that the identity of a club can not solely rely on the main sponsor. The group also makes a clear political statement, "Together for Leipzig – Rasenball against Racism". The statement can be found on scarves sold by the group, and on a banner inside the stadium. RB Leipzig had previously refused to allow supporter groups such as Rasenballisten to sell their own merchandise at the stadium, but after lengthy negotiations, the club has given permission.

The ultra group Red Aces took position against Legida, the local offshoot of Pegida, at the beginning of 2015. In an open letter to the club, the stadium operator, the Mayor of Leipzig and the citizens of Leipzig in January 2015, the group asked for support against a planned demonstration by Legida. The demonstration was set to begin near the Red Bull Arena, and the group specifically asked for the stadium lights to be switched off at the time of the demonstration. The stadium operator decided to support the initiative and agreed to switch off the lighting. Red Aces had also previously asked the club for permission to display banners against racism and Legida during the last home game of 2014. The club refused to approve the requested banners, according to Red Aces because the club did not want politics in the stadium. Despite the ban, the group displayed a banner directed towards Legida proclaiming the city of Leipzig to be diverse, cosmopolitan and tolerant. In response to the demonstrations by Legida, the anti-racist action group Rasenball gegen Rassismus was founded by initiative of supporter groups Red Aces, Lecrats, Rabauken – Block 31 and IG Rasenballisten in January 2015. Before the home match against SpVgg Greuther Fürth on 3 August 2015, Red Aces again asked for permission to display a banner against Legida, with the text "Ligaspiel und Legida – der Montag ist zum Kotzen da". The club refused to approve the requested banner. During the home match against FC St. Pauli on 23 August 2015, Red Aces defied the supposed ban on anti-racist banners in the stadium through displaying a banner with a clear anti-Nazi message. Sporting director Ralf Rangnick later stated that there was no ban against anti-racist messages in stadium, explaining that the banner was prohibited before the home match against SpVgg Greuther Fürth because it contained abusive language, and that the club of course would agree if a fan wanted to display a banner with a message such as "RBL Fans against Racism".

Fans at away sides
RB Leipzig supporters travelled in numbers to the first away match of 2016, against FC St. Pauli on 12 February 2016. Nearly 2,500 RB Leipzig supporters made its way to the Millerntorstadion and displayed a red and white flag tifo at the match start. An even higher number of RB Leipzig supporters accompanied the team to Nuremberg one month later. The away match against 1. FC Nürnberg on 20 March 2016 at the Grundig-Stadion was attended by 2,800 RB Leipzig supporters, according to club statistics. The number set a new club record for away supporters, which was broken in the first two Bundesliga seasons. More than 7,000 supporters attended away matches in Dortmund, Munich and Berlin, with a one-year record at the away match in Berlin, when 8,500 supporters of RBL had gathered to watch their team qualify for the UEFA Champions League. One year later, more than 9,000 fans travelled for the last away game of the 2017–18 season in Berlin.

Fanprojekt Leipzig
The organization Fanprojekt Leipzig was founded in 2011 by initiative of the city of Leipzig and is run by Outlaw gGmbH, full name Outlaw gemeinnützige Gesellschaft für Kinder- und Jugendhilfe mbH. Outlaw gGmbH is a Münster based non-profit company for child and youth welfare. The basic framework of the Fanprojekt Leipzig was concluded by the City of Leipzig, the Free State of Saxony and the German Football Association (DFB), and the organization receives funding from the City of Leipzig and the DFB.

Fanprojekt Leipzig is an organization for young football fans of different clubs in Leipzig, and works as an independent institution towards the different clubs. The main areas for the organization are promoting a positive supporter culture, violence prevention, help for young supporters in problem situations and establishing communication between all parties involved, such as supporters, clubs, police and law enforcement. Fanprojekt Leipzig is part of a network of similar Fanprojekts in numerous German cities. The different Fanprojekts are supported by a national coordination office (KOS).

Fanprojekt Leipzig runs a number of centers in Leipzig used for purposes such as recreational activities, content projects, painting and creation of minor choreographies, and as meeting places. For each club, the organization offers a social worker or pedagogue who works exclusively with supporters of that club. The organization carries out a variety of recreational and educational activities, including sporting activities, creative projects, readings and discussions and educational programs. The organization has presence during match days, where it is available for personal contact by supporters, police and law enforcement, with the aim to be able to mediate between the parties and have a de-escalating effect.

RB Leipzig entered a cooperation agreement with Fanprojekt Leipzig in 2013. The cooperation agreement involves collaboration in eight categories, involving both home and away matches, as well as anti-racism work. The detailed cooperation agreement was by then a novelty in Germany. In addition, the RB Leipzig formed a stadium ban commission, in which Fanprojekt Leipzig provides advice to the club. Fanprojekt Leipzig has also arranged a number of events, in which supporters can discuss the development of the supporter scene, and whose results are presented for the club.

Organization and finance

Association
RasenballSport Leipzig e.V is a registered voluntary association. Its executive body is the Vorstand, the management board. The management board is appointed by the Ehrenrat, the honorary board. It is also subordinated to the Aufsichtsrat, the supervisory board. The honorary board is elected directly by the club members at the general meeting.

Significant organizational changes were made in 2014, following requirements set up by the German Football League (DFL). One of the requirements was to change the composition of organizational bodies. Both the management board and the honorary board had been composed by either employees or agents of Red Bull. This effectively contradicted fundamental principles of the 50+1 rule, as interpreted by the DFL, and which aims to forbid the influence of third parties on the sporting decisions of a club. As a part of a compromise with the DFL, the club made a binding declaration to ensure that the management board was to be occupied by a majority of persons independent of Red Bull.

In addition, a supervisory board was added. The honorary board had performed tasks that are normally performed by a separate controlling organizational body. These functions were now transferred to a newly created supervisory board that can perform these tasks independently. The club decided to transfer the former members of the honorary board to the newly created supervisory board.

The association is responsible for men's junior teams from U8 to U14 and all women's football teams.

Membership
Voting membership is severely restricted. In contrast to all other association football clubs in Germany, there is no official way to become a voting member of RasenballSport Leipzig e.V. According to Ulrich Wolter, the club does not aspire towards the high number of members of other clubs. Wolter has also pointed at other clubs, where Ultras have succeeded in creating structures, and stated that the club absolutely wants to avoid such conditions.

For the establishment of a registered voluntary association, an association is required by German law to have at least seven members. Four years after its founding, the club had only 9 members, all employees of Red Bull. By 2014 the registration fee for membership stood at 100 euros and the annual membership fee at 800 euros, in comparison to Bayern Munich who, by that time, offered membership at annual fees between 30 and 60 euros. In addition to this, a person willing to pay the fee could not expect to become a member, since the management board could reject an application without notice.

This restrictive membership policy met criticism, thus one of the original requirements set up by the DFL in order to obtain a license for the 2014–15 2. Bundesliga season was to lower the membership fees and open up the association for new members. The club responded to the pressure from the DFL and announced changes to the membership in June 2014. It is now possible for a person to become an official supporting member. The annual fee for this type of membership is between 70 and 1000 euros and serves to promote junior football within the club. In return, a supporting member receives certain privileges such as a meeting with the professional team and a fitness session at the Red Bull Arena. Supporting members also have the right to attend general meetings, although without voting rights. In order to improve participation in the association, supporting members are represented by one member in the supervisory board.

GmbH
On 2 December 2014, the general meeting of the association voted unanimously for the founding of a spin-off organization in the form of a GmbH. The decision was taken at an extraordinary meeting. Present were 14 voting members and 40 supporting members. Chairman Oliver Mintzlaff stated that the change was made for the club to be able to step up professionally and to remain competitive. The RasenballSport Leipzig GmbH is responsible for the professional team, the reserve team and men's junior teams from U15 and above.

As of 2015, Red Bull GmbH is the main shareholder of RasenballSport Leipzig GmbH, holding 99 percent of the shares. The remaining one percent is held by the association. However, as required by the 50 + 1 rule, formal power lies with the association, holding the majority of votes.

As of April 2016, the general manager of RasenballSport Leipzig GmbH is Oliver Mintzlaff.

Sponsorship
RB Leipzig's kits were first provided by German sportswear brand Adidas from the club's founding. In 2014, the club switched to the American sportswear brand Nike, in an agreement that will be in place until at least 2025. In October 2014, the club also entered into promotional agreements with Hugo Boss, Porsche as youth sponsor, and Volkswagen for stadium commercials. On 20 May 2016, RB Leipzig extended its contract with Krostitzer Brauerei to be its official beer partner until 2018.

Charity
In March 2020, RB Leipzig, Borussia Dortmund, Bayern Munich, and Bayer Leverkusen, the four German UEFA Champions League teams for the 2019–20 season, collectively gave €20 million to Bundesliga and 2. Bundesliga teams that were struggling financially during the COVID-19 pandemic.

Players

Squad

Players out on loan

Notable players

Most appearances
Statistics correct as of 11 August 2022.

Players with 100 appearances or more are listed.
Appearances include league matches at professional level in the German football league system (Bundesliga, 2. Bundesliga and 3. Liga).
Appearances include substitute appearances.
Players marked in bold are still playing for the club.

Top goalscorers
Statistics correct as of 11 August 2022.

Players with 50 goals or more are listed.
Players marked in bold are still playing for the club.

Captains
Only captains in competitive matches are included.
Players marked in bold are still playing in the professional team.

Staff

Current staff

Coach history 

Notes
 Interim coach.

Season history

European competitions

Overview
Having finished as runners-up in their debut season in the German top flight, RB Leipzig gained entry to continental football for the first time, specifically the 2017–18 UEFA Champions League. RB Leipzig is one of the first clubs in history to qualify for the Champions League so soon (eight years) after its creation. The campaign also saw Red Bull Salzburg qualify as Austrian champions; this raised the issue of a possible conflict of interest between the clubs due to the level of influence exerted by Red Bull over both teams and the close sporting relationship between them in various aspects. After examining the operational structures during June 2017, UEFA declared themselves satisfied under their regulations that the two clubs (particularly Salzburg) were suitably independent from the Red Bull corporation, and sufficiently distinct from one another, for both be admitted to their competitions.

In the first season following that ruling, both reached the quarter-finals of the 2017–18 UEFA Europa League but did not play each other, with RB Leipzig eliminated by Olympique de Marseille who then also knocked out Salzburg in the semi-finals. However, in the next edition of the same competition, RB Leipzig and Red Bull Salzburg were drawn together in Group B to meet competitively for the first time. Salzburg were the victors in both fixtures between the clubs (3–2 in Germany, 1–0 in Austria) and also won all their other matches to top the group, while Leipzig failed to progress after dropping further points against Celtic and Rosenborg.

Statistics

Results 

Source: UEFA.com, Last updated on 14 March 2023

Notes
 2QR: Second qualifying round
 3QR: Third qualifying round
 KRPO: Knockout round play-offs
 R32: Round of 32
 R16: Round of 16
 QF: Quarter-finals
 SF: Semi-finals

RB Leipzig affiliated teams

RB Leipzig has several affiliated teams, including a women's team, and junior and academy teams.

Honours

Domestic
League
 Bundesliga
 Runners-up: 2016–17, 2020–21
 2. Bundesliga (II)
 Runners-up: 2015–16
 3. Liga (III)
 Runners-up: 2013–14
 Regionalliga Nordost (IV)
 Champions: 2012–13
 NOFV-Oberliga Süd (V)
 Champions: 2009–10

Cup
 DFB-Pokal
 Winners: 2021–22
 Runners-up: 2018–19, 2020–21
 DFL-Supercup
 Runners-up: 2022
 Saxony Cup
 Winners: 2010–11, 2012–13

European
UEFA Champions League
 Semi-finalists: 2019–20
UEFA Europa League
 Semi-finalists: 2021–22

Affiliated clubs
The following clubs are currently affiliated with RB Leipzig:
 FC Red Bull Salzburg (2009–present)
 New York Red Bulls (2009–present)
 Red Bull Brasil (2009–present)
 Red Bull Bragantino (2020–present)
 FC Goa (2020–present)
The following clubs were affiliated with RB Leipzig in the past:
 SSV Markranstädt (2009–2010)
 Red Bull Ghana (2009–2014)
 ESV Delitzsch (2010–2011)

Criticism
The establishment of RB Leipzig has caused much controversy in Germany. The controversy has revolved around the apparent involvement of Red Bull GmbH and the restrictive membership policy. This has been seen as contrary to common practice in Germany, where football clubs have traditionally relied on voluntary registered associations, with sometimes very large number of members, and where the 50 + 1 rule has ensured that club members have a formal controlling stake. RB Leipzig has been criticized for allegedly being founded as a marketing tool and for allegedly taking commercialization of football in Germany to a new level. The club has been rejected as a "marketing club", a "commercial club" or a "plastic club". The criticism has been widespread. Critics have been found both in the management and among coaches and supporters of other clubs.

The introduction of RB Leipzig was met with protests from supporters of other Leipzig football clubs, notably 1. FC Lokomotive Leipzig and FC Sachsen Leipzig. They feared a decline of traditional fan culture in Leipzig, and a commercialization of football in the region. After the partnership with SSV Markranstädt had become known, protests immediately appeared in Leipzig suburbs. Red Bull advertising boards at the Stadion am Bad in Markranstädt was smeared with graffiti and the pitch was purposely destroyed by a weed killer. Protests in Leipzig were generally non-violent. Despite RB Leipzig playing its inaugural season in 2009–10 in the same league as FC Lokomotive Leipzig and FC Sachsen Leipzig, criticism from these clubs was moderate. FC Lokomotive Leipzig chairman Steffen Kubald nevertheless said that the match against RB Leipzig would for each team be the match of the season, and that RB Leipzig was the "Bayern Munich of the Oberliga".

The German economist Dr. Tobias Kollman said in 2009 that he saw Red Bull GmbH as a company with clear economic goals for its projects. Consequently, he described RB Leipzig as a "marketing club" and said that it was the first of this kind in Germany. He further described the activities of Red Bull GmbH in Leipzig a "sports political earthquake" in Germany. Borussia Dortmund chairman Hans-Joachim Watzke and Eintracht Frankfurt chairman Heribet Bruchhagen warned in 2013 that clubs backed by major companies or financially strong patrons could pose a threat to the entire Bundesliga, talking of a "clash of culture". They complained that such clubs are pushing back traditional clubs, and warned that RB Leipzig could well be the next such club to push a traditional club out of the Bundesliga. Hans-Joachim Watzke said in 2014 that he considered RB Leipzig as behaving "morally questionable", with reference to its transfer policy in close cooperation with FC Red Bull Salzburg, and pointed at its signing of Marcel Sabitzer. Hans-Joachim Watzke has nevertheless said that he was not an opponent of RB Leipzig, that he would appreciate a Bundesliga club from Saxony and that RB Leipzig was warmly welcome as long as the German Football Association (DFB) ensures that the club complies with the "democratic rules of football" and the club finances its own operations. Peter Neururer has been a more fierce critic. As head coach of VfL Bochum, he said in 2014 that RB Leipzig "made him sick" and that he considered the club to be built on purely economical interests. He further complained that competing with RB Leipzig was not a fair deal, because the club could sign the players it wanted, and that such competition "had nothing to do with the sport that we love".

RB Leipzig and Red Bull GmbH have met protests from supporter groups across Germany. Supporters of traditional clubs have regarded RB Leipzig as a symbol of a victory of money over tradition and have rejected the club as a "plastic club". They have protested against commercialization of football, the apparent involvement of Red Bull GmbH and the allegedly undemocratic structures at RB Leipzig.

After RB Leipzig gained promotion to 2. Bundesliga in 2014, supporter groups from ten clubs in the 2. Bundesliga created a campaign against the club, called "Nein zu RB" ("No to RB"). Since then, numerous groups across Germany have joined the campaign. In March 2015, the campaign web page indicated a number of 182 supporter groups from 29 clubs.

At away matches, the club has regularly been greeted with protests in various forms. During the away match against 1. FC Union Berlin on 21 September 2014, the home supporters symbolically wore black plastic ponchos and were silent for the first 15 minutes of the match. A large banner displayed by home supporters said: "In Leipzig, the football culture is dying". Another banner displayed said: "Football needs workers' participation, loyalty, standing terraces, emotion, financial fair play, tradition, transparency, passion, history, independence". The producers of Union's matchday program devised a more humorous protest for RB Leipzig's August 2015 visit, replacing the page that would normally be dedicated to the visiting team with an article on the history of bull farming. At the away match against FC Erzgebirge Aue on 6 February 2015, the home supporters displayed banners which compared Dietrich Mateschitz to Adolf Hitler and supporters of RB Leipzig to blind Nazi followers. FC Erzgebirge Aue was later fined 35,000 euros by the DFB for the banners. At the away match against 1. FC Heidenheim on 18 September 2015, the player bus was approached upon the arrival at the stadium by supporters of 1. FC Heidenheim who pelted the bus with hundreds of counterfeit dollar bills printed with a caricature of Dietrich Mateschitz depicted with a large hooked nose and the text "Scheiß Red Bull" ("Shitty Red Bull") and "In Capitalism he trusts". The action later led to a police investigation, for a possibly dangerous interference with traffic safety and for the imprint.

During the home match against FC Hansa Rostock on 23 November 2013, the away supporters protested by being entirely absent for the first seven minutes of the match and then filled the guest block in large numbers. A similar protest was also carried out during the home match against 1. FC Union Berlin on 19 February 2016. Other supporter groups in Germany have entirely refused to travel to away matches at the Red Bull Arena.

At some occasions, the protests have turned into violence and threats. RB Leipzig had to cancel three friendly matches in July 2009 for security reasons. At the first league match, away against FC Carl Zeiss Jena II on 8 August 2009, riots started when the police dissolved a blockade attempting to prevent the player bus from entering the stadium. The player bus was attacked with bottles, and the police had to use pepper spray to overcome them. The team was insulted, spat at and pelted with beer cups during the warm-up, and had to leave the stadium with a police escort after the match. At the away match against Hallescher FC on 19 July 2013, the player bus was again attacked. Riots also started after the match when home supporters tried to break through a security perimeter to approach away supporters. Firecrackers and other objects were thrown at the police, and four police officers were slightly injured in the turmoil. Before the away match against Karlsruher SC on 9 March 2015, several supporters of RB Leipzig received letters, indirectly threatening them with violence if they decided to support their team in Karlsruhe. The night before the match, the lobby of the player hotel in Karlsruhe was stormed by local hooligans.

Several football clubs, such as VfB Stuttgart, 1. FC Nürnberg, TSV 1860 Munich, 1. FC Union Berlin, FC Erzgebirge Aue, Kickers Offenbach, Chemnitzer FC and KSV Hessen Kassel, have cancelled friendly matches against RB Leipzig, due to protests from their own supporters.

Some critics can however also be found among the supporters of RB Leipzig. The supporter group Rasenballisten describes itself as uniting critical supporters. The group members have stated that the identity of a club cannot solely rely on its main sponsor and the group has criticized Red Bull GmbH for dominating the external representation of the club. Instead, the group wants to emphasize the name RasenBallsport and the Leipzig identity.

Representatives of Red Bull GmbH and RB Leipzig and other people have commented on the issues and responded to the criticism. Sporting director Ralf Rangnick has pointed at the fact that sponsors and investors are also present at other clubs. He has rhetorically asked what the difference was between the commitments of Audi AG and Adidas AG at FC Bayern Munich, and the commitment of Red Bull GmbH at RB Leipzig? He admitted that there was a difference: FC Bayern Munich first had sporting success, and then sponsors and investors. However, he insisted that the situation at VfL Wolfsburg and Bayer Leverkusen was exactly the same, and that VfL Wolfsburg became German champions in 2009 to a large extent due to the financial support from Volkswagen AG. Dietrich Mateschitz said in 2009 that the sports commitment of Red Bull GmbH was indeed different from the sports commitments of other companies. He explained that when the company is committed in sports, it is involved in the sports operations itself. He has further explained in 2007 that where the company is committed, it is integrated and takes responsibility for the sports performance, with a wish to build the identity of the brand and the sport. General manager Ulrich Wolter said in 2013 that Dietrich Mateschitz was not an oligarch or a Sheikh who buys a toy club, but someone who tries to generate success through long-term sustainable contribution to youth and professional football. Ulrich Wolter has also commented on club's profile and said that it was only normal for a sponsor to want to make its brand known.

It has been suggested that the restrictive membership policy was implemented in order to prevent the club from being taken over by hostile supporters. General manager Ulrich Wolter commented on the restrictive membership policy in 2013 and said that the club wanted to offer the greatest possible degree of legal certainty for its investors. He also said that the conditions that had prevailed at some other clubs had certainly not been positive for their development. Blogger Matthias Kiessling, who has covered RB Leipzig continually since 2010, commented on the restrictive membership policy in 2013 and said that the much lauded membership system of other clubs only existed pro forma anyway, and that participation now takes place via other channels, such as social media. RB Leipzig and club supporters have since the club's founding successively developed procedures to enable participation and dialogue. The club entered a cooperation agreement with the supporter organization Fanprojekt Leipzig in 2013, and the club also has a dialogue with the fan representatives of the supporter union Fanverband RB Leipzig Fans.

Both Dietrich Mateschitz and sporting director Ralf Rangnick have made comments on transfer policy. Dietrich Mateschitz commented on the football commitment of Red Bull GmbH in 2007 and said that the company was "no good stars buyers". In an interview with Austrian sports website Sportnet in 2010 he said: "I am not Abramovich. What we do, we try to do with our brain. Nothing is easier than to take a bag full of money and go shopping. That is stupid, stupid we are not". In an interview with German newspaper Leipziger Volkszeitung in 2013 he further said: "It is not about a race, to arrive as soon as possible in the Bundesliga with as many mercenaries as possible, but about healthy development and healthy growth. And that with as many own players as possible". Sporting director Ralf Rangnick commented on the club's transfer policy in 2013 and said that RB Leipzig was actually fishing in a very small pond, only signing players aged between 17 and 23 years old, and that RB Leipzig was the only club in the 2. Bundesliga who had not signed any players from another club in the league. The establishment of a successful youth academy has also been an integral part of the club's long-term strategy since its founding. Dietrich Mateschitz said in 2009 that his hopes were that the majority of the professional team would in the future have come through the ranks of the club's own academy. General manager Ulrich Wolter said in 2013 that the club wanted to build an "Eastern lighthouse", so that young players from eastern Germany would not always have to migrate to the west of their country to develop. The youth work at RB Leipzig received much praise from the German Football League (DFL) in 2014.

Several people have responded to the rejection of RB Leipzig as a "plastic club", which lacks traditions. Sporting director Joachim Krug said in 2009 that RB Leipzig was simply a newly founded club with high ambitions. Head coach Tino Vogel said that at some point, every new tradition begins. Supporters of RB Leipzig were noted for displaying banners saying "Let this tradition begin" during the first competitive matches in 2009, and manager Dieter Gudel said in 2010 that RB Leipzig could well write "Tradition since 2009" on its pennants. Dietrich Mateschitz said in 2013 that the only difference between RB Leipzig and FC Bayern Munich was one hundred years of tradition, and that in five hundred years, RB Leipzig will be five hundred years old and FC Bayern Munich six hundred years old. By this, he meant that RB Leipzig will one day become a traditional club.

Sporting director Ralf Rangnick declared in 2012 that there were actually advantages to working in a new club without deep-rooted traditions. He explained that structural changes and staffing decisions could be implemented quickly and flexibly at RB Leipzig, since there are no established hierarchies and less resistance in the environment. He further said that he had seen enough examples of traditional clubs which have not made it anywhere. He said that to him, what mattered was if there existed a working philosophy and sustainability. The President of the DFB Wolfgang Niersbach said in 2014, with reference to the traditional clubs in Leipzig: "If the big traditional clubs have not managed to establish a serious way back in professional football for years and decades, then nobody should complain if a different approach is taken and this also leads to success".

RB Leipzig has also received positive criticism and praise. Entrepreneur Michael Kölmel, owner of the Zentralstadion, said in 2009 that Red Bull GmbH was a huge opportunity for Leipzig. He has also said that in the end, other football clubs in Leipzig will benefit from RB Leipzig. He explained that young players will stay in the area and that the overall level of football in Leipzig will rise. Leipzig Deputy Mayor Heiko Rosenthal said in 2010 that RB Leipzig was the "best thing" that could happen to the economical development of Leipzig. He has further explained that RB Leipzig will draw attention to Leipzig, and constitute an important component in the future economical representation of the city. Blogger Matthias Kiessling argued in 2011 that Red Bull GmbH was offering a more permanent investment than anything Saxony had seen since the fall of the Berlin Wall. Leipzig Mayor Burkhard Jung said in 2011 that the investment of Red Bull GmbH in Leipzig was an "incredible gift to the city". Dietrich Mateschitz was awarded the prize "Leipziger Lerche" in 2013 for his service to the region. Mayor Burkhard Jung praised Dietrich Mateschitz as "honest, ambitious and serious". The prize ceremony was for the first time attended by the Minister-president of Saxony, Stanislaw Tillich.

The chairman of the Saxony Football Association (SFV) Klaus Reichenbach expressed optimism about the club's founding. He said that he hoped for high class football, and that it would have benefited the whole region and eastern Germany. The chairman of the Northeastern German Football Association (NOFV) Rainer Milkoreit said in 2014 that the promotion of RB Leipzig to the 2. Bundesliga was a great development for eastern Germany and that the attendance boom in Leipzig showed just how much the club had been awaited. FC Bayern Munich President Uli Hoeneß said in 2011 that the model chosen by RB Leipzig could be prosperous, but not necessarily. He said that decisive would be what the club could offer its fans, and that if the model works, it would be beneficial for all football, not only for football in eastern Germany. Uli Hoeneß congratulated RB Leipzig to its promotion to the 2. Bundesliga in 2014 and said that it was the best thing that could happen to football in Leipzig. FC Bayern Munich sporting director Matthias Sammer, a native of Dresden, said in 2014 that he was positive to the development of RB Leipzig, and praised the positive economical effects it had for the region. He also rejected the complaints of "traditionalists", as 1. FC Lokomotive Leipzig and BSG Chemie Leipzig ever since the Wende have failed to join forces for the sake of local football. Franz Beckenbauer said in 2015 that he predicts that RB Leipzig will be dangerous to FC Bayern Munich in 35 years, if Red Bull GmbH is ready to continue investing for such a long time, and that RB Leipzig was a concept with a future. VfL Wolfsburg manager Klaus Allofs said in 2016 that RB Leipzig was a cast of fortune for Leipzig, and a good thing for the region and for German football.

In interviews published in German newspaper Bild in 2011, representatives of several Leipzig football clubs explained how their clubs had benefited from the establishment of RB Leipzig. Former FC Sachsen Leipzig liquidator Heiko Kratz explained that by 2009, the club was no longer able to finance its youth academy, but by selling its A to D junior teams to RB Leipzig, at least they could give the players a future. Holger Nussbaum from SSV Markranstädt, explained how the financial compensation from RB Leipzig meant that the club now had players that it otherwise would not have, and that it now aimed at reaching the Regionalliga. Ralph Zahn from ESV Delitzsch said that the financial compensation from RB Leipzig had made it possible for the club to build an artificial turf pitch with floodlights for the cost of 250,000 euros.

According to a survey carried out by the Leipziger Volkszeitung in 2009, more than 70% of the residents of Leipzig welcomed Red Bull GmhH's investment in local football. The Leipziger Volkszeitung has also published the results from a study carried out by Intelligence Research in Sponsorshop (Iris) in 2016. According to the study, RB Leipzig now ranked third favourite team in Saxony and Thuringia, only surpassed by FC Bayern Munich and Borussia Dortmund. RB Leipzig also had an increase in five out of six image values. Sympathetic had increased 2.8 percent to 45.1 percent, native had increased 7.2 percent to 40.5 percent, credible had increased 4.8 percent to 43.8 percent, regionally rooted remained at 45.8 percent, ambitious had increased 3.7 percent to 77.5 percent and passionate had increased 5.8 percent to 47 percent. A study carried out by the company Repucom in 2016 showed that RB Leipzig had a nationwide increase of 60 percent in press, radio and television. It also showed that the reports had become more objective and complex.

Notes

References

External links

Official website
RB Leipzig profile at Weltfussball.de
RB Fans.de

 
Football clubs in Germany
Football clubs in Saxony
Association football clubs established in 2009
Red Bull sports teams
RB
2009 establishments in Germany
Bundesliga clubs
2. Bundesliga clubs
3. Liga clubs